Villis is a surname. Notable people with the surname include:

Marjorie Villis (1891–1981), English actress
Matt Villis (born 1984), English footballer

See also
Willis (surname)